The Ministry of the Environment is a government ministry of Estonia responsible for the issue of policies regarding climate, mineral resources, environmental awareness, fisheries and hunting in Estonia. The current Minister of the Environment is Madis Kallas.

List of Ministers

References

External links
Official website

Environment
Estonia